WWEL (103.9 FM, "SAM 103.9") is a radio station licensed to serve London, Kentucky. The station is owned by Forcht Broadcasting, a Forcht Group of Kentucky Company and licensed to F.T.G. Broadcasting, Inc.

The station has been assigned these call letters by the Federal Communications Commission since May 21, 1979.  The station had been previously assigned WFTG-FM, after its sister station WFTG (1400 AM). For several years the format was country music  before the format change and rebranding of the station to SAM 103.9 (shifting to Hot AC after the shutdown of the Sam FM network during the 2015 Labor Day weekend).

References

External links
WWEL official website

WEL
Adult hits radio stations in the United States
Radio stations established in 1979
1970 establishments in Kentucky
London, Kentucky